V. Thangapandian (died 31 July 1997) was an Indian politician and Member of the Legislative Assembly of Tamil Nadu. He was elected to the Tamil Nadu legislative assembly as a Dravida Munnetra Kazhagam candidate from Aruppukottai constituency in 1989 and  1996 elections.

Thangapandian died on 31 July 1997.

References 

Dravida Munnetra Kazhagam politicians
1997 deaths
Tamil Nadu MLAs 1996–2001
Year of birth missing